Boeve is a surname. Notable people with the surname include:

Henk Boeve (born 1957), Dutch racing cyclist
Lieven Boeve (born 1966), Belgian Catholic theologian
May Boeve, American environmental activist
Peter Boeve (born 1957), Dutch footballer and coach

Dutch-language surnames